Bukit Baru is a mukim and town in Melaka Tengah District, Malacca, Malaysia, which is administered by two local governments: Hang Tuah Jaya Municipal Council to the north and Historical Malacca City Council to the south.

Education

Tourist attractions

References

See also
 Hang Tuah Jaya

Central Melaka District
Mukims of Malacca